Framed is a 1975 American crime film directed by Phil Karlson and starring Joe Don Baker and Conny Van Dyke. It was the final film of Karlson's Hollywood career.

Plot
Returning home to Tennessee from a trip to Texas, nightclub owner and gambler Ron Lewis happens across a shooting and is nearly shot himself.  A deputy confronts Lewis as he arrives at his home.  He accuses Lewis of being involved in the shooting and roughs him up, resulting in a fight that ends up in the deputy being killed and Lewis being badly beaten. Lewis is  placed under arrest for the death of the deputy.

Corrupt cops, including a thieving sheriff, and lawyers (including his own) ignore Lewis' claim of self-defense and railroad him into a prison sentence of up to 10 years. His girlfriend Susan is sexually assaulted and warned not to aid Lewis' defense in any way.

Behind bars, Lewis is befriended by mob boss Sal Viccarone and hit man Vince Greeson. He is paroled after four years and immediately sets out to get even with those who wronged him. Vince, also out of prison, is contracted to kill Lewis, but decides to help him instead, as does a law-abiding deputy, Sam Perry.

Lewis proceeds to torment and even torture the guilty parties in a number of ways, gaining his revenge and finding out the truth about what really happened the night of the roadside shooting.

Cast
 Joe Don Baker as Ron Lewis
 Conny Van Dyke as Susan Barrett 
 Gabriel Dell as Vince Greeson
 John Marley as Sal Viccarrone
 Brock Peters as Sam Perry
 John Larch as Bundy
 Warren J. Kemmerling as Morello (as Warren Kemmerling)
 Paul Mantee as Frank
 Walter Brooke as Senator Tatum
 Joshua Bryant as Andrew Ney
 Hunter von Leer as Dewey
 Les Lannom as Gary
 H. B. Haggerty as Bickford
 Hoke Howell as Decker
 Lawrence Montaigne as Deputy Allison
 Red West as Mallory
 Brenton Banks as Jeremiah 
 Ken Lester as Big Jim
 Henry O. Arnold as Lenny
 Gary Gober as Kenny
 Lloyd Tatum as Deputy Wilson
 Roy Jenson as Haskins

See also
 List of American films of 1975

References

External links

1975 films
1970s action films
1975 crime drama films
American crime drama films
1970s English-language films
Films scored by Patrick Williams
American films about revenge
Films based on American novels
Films based on crime novels
Films directed by Phil Karlson
Films set in Tennessee
Films shot in Tennessee
Paramount Pictures films
American neo-noir films
1970s American films